Skilak Lake (Dena'ina: Q'es Dudilen Bena) is a large lake on the Kenai Peninsula, Alaska. The lake is part of the Kenai River system but also contains glacial runoff, being fed by meltwater from Skilak Glacier. The water is exceptionally clear with a mostly rocky bottom, relatively free of aquatic vegetation. It is within the Kenai National Wildlife Refuge, and can be accessed by Skilak Lake Loop Road via the Sterling Highway. Early Russian explorers mistakenly believed Skilak and Tustumena Lake to be a single body of water. It is a popular destination for Alaskans due to it being only about a half-hour drive from Soldotna, and approximately two hours from Anchorage. There are two campgrounds at the lake, one is a developed campground with a host, the other un-hosted and with only basic facilities. There are many well-developed and maintained trails along the lake and its access road, as well as campgrounds and public-access cabins.

See also
List of lakes of Alaska

References

External links
 Skilak Lake information
 photo gallery

Lakes of Alaska
Lakes of Kenai Peninsula Borough, Alaska